Teri Copley (born May 10, 1961) is an American actress and model. She is known for her role on the American NBC/syndicated television series We Got It Made, which premiered in 1983, co-starred on the 1985 CBS television series I Had Three Wives, and appeared as a panelist in the 1989 pilot for Match Game 90. She appeared in the 1984 television film I Married a Centerfold and the 1992 film Brain Donors. She posed nude and was the cover girl for Playboy for the November 1990 issue. In the 1990s Copley became a born-again Christian and eased her way out of Hollywood.

In 2003, she released a book about her faith, entitled Conversations Between a Girl and Her God.

Family
Copley is married to Charles Wahlheim. She was previously married to rock musician and guitarist Micki Free and prior to that, late actor Christopher Mayer. She has a daughter from each of her first two marriages.

In 2018, Copley appeared on the Dr. Phil television series seeking help for her adult daughter Ashley, whose boyfriend Hector was accused by Copley of being physically abusive.

Film

Television

References

External links

1961 births
People from Arcadia, California
American film actresses
American television actresses
Living people
Actresses from California
20th-century American actresses
American evangelicals
Female models from California
21st-century American women